Across the Rio Grande  is a 1949 American Western film directed by Oliver Drake and starring Jimmy Wakely, Dub Taylor, and Reno Browne. It was released on May 15, 1949.

Cast list
 Jimmy Wakely as Jimmy Wakely
 Dub Taylor as Cannonball (credited as "Cannonball" Taylor)
 Reno Browne as Sally Blaine
 Riley Hill as Steven Blaine
 Dennis Moore as Carson
 Kenne Duncan as Joe Bardet
 Ted Adams as Tom Sloan
 Myron Healey as Stage Holdup Man
 Bud Osborne as Stage Driver
 Polly Bergen as Cantina Singer (as Polly Burgin)
 Bob Curtis as Gil (henchman)
 Carol Henry as Lewis (henchman)
 Boyd Stockman as Ed (henchman)
 William Bailey as Sheriff Reid

References

External links 
 
 
 

Monogram Pictures films
1949 Western (genre) films
1949 films
American Western (genre) films
Films directed by Oliver Drake
American black-and-white films
1940s English-language films
1940s American films